Prince Charles Strait is a strait  wide between Cornwallis and Elephant Islands, in the South Shetland Islands of Antarctica. The strait was known to sailors as early as 1821, but the first record of its navigation was in 1839 by the brig Porpoise of the United States Exploring Expedition squadron under Wilkes. Soundings of the strait were made by the vessel John Biscoe and the frigate HMS Sparrow in December 1948. It was named for Charles, then  Prince of Wales, son of Queen Elizabeth II of the United Kingdom.

References

External links
 UK Antarctic Place-names Committee: Map 13676: South Shetland Islands : Elephant, Clarence and Gibbs Islands, M 1 : 220 000, by: data.aad.gov.au, Australian Antarctic Data Centre

Straits of the South Shetland Islands
Elephant Island